Antun Kropivšek (17 May 1925 – 12 July 2013) was a Croatian gymnast. He competed in eight events at the 1952 Summer Olympics.

References

1925 births
2013 deaths
Croatian male artistic gymnasts
Olympic gymnasts of Yugoslavia
Gymnasts at the 1952 Summer Olympics
People from Šentjur